Stephen Farrugia (born 25 April 1964) is a Maltese judoka. He competed in the men's half-lightweight event at the 1988 Summer Olympics.

References

1964 births
Living people
Maltese male judoka
Olympic judoka of Malta
Judoka at the 1988 Summer Olympics
Place of birth missing (living people)